List of major active Turkish Naval Forces installations.

Naval Bases 
 Aksaz Naval Base
 Bartın Naval Base
 Erdek Naval Base
 Foça Naval Base
 Gölcük Naval Base
 Iskenderun Naval Base
 Pasha Liman Base
 Sürmene Naval Base

Shipyards 
 Gölcük Naval Shipyard
 Taşkızak Naval Shipyard
 Istanbul Naval Shipyard

Air Bases 
 Cengiz Topel Naval Air Station

Schools 
 Turkish Naval High School
 Turkish Naval Academy

Museums 
 Çanakkale Naval Museum
 İskenderun Naval Museum
 Istanbul Naval Museum
 İzmir Naval Museum
 Kocaeli Naval Museum
 Mersin Naval Museum

References 

Installatrions